{
	"type": "FeatureCollection",
	"features": [
		{
			"type": "Feature",
			"properties": { "marker-symbol": "monument", "title": "Kara" },
			"geometry": { "type": "Point", "coordinates": [81.3640022, 25.6958063] }
		},
		{
			"type": "Feature",
			"properties": { "marker-symbol": "monument", "title": "Bhilsa" },
			"geometry": { "type": "Point", "coordinates": [77.8081363, 23.5251102] }
		}
	]
}
As a general of Sultan Jalaluddin, Alauddin Khalji (then known as Ali Gurshasp) raided the Paramara city of Bhilsa in 1293 CE. He damaged the city's Hindu temples, and looted a large amount of wealth.

Background 

Alauddin Khalji was the governor of Kara in Sultan Jalaluddin's Delhi Sultanate. Although he feigned allegiance to the Sultan, he was determined to dethrone Jalaluddin, and sought to raise money for a successful coup. Towards this objective, he decided to target Bhilsa, a wealthy city in the Paramara kingdom of Malwa. By the 1290s, the Paramaras had been weakened by Chahamana, Vaghela, and Yadava invasions. In late 1292 CE, Alauddin Khalji obtained the Sultan's permission to raid Bhilsa.

The raid 

In 1293 CE, Alauddin marched towards Bhilsa via the Chanderi-Ujjain road. His sudden attack took the city's residents by surprise.

The town had several richly-endowed Hindu temples, from which Alauddin obtained a large amount of wealth, including precious metals and cattle. The residents of Bhilsa concealed their idols in the riverbed of Betwa to prevent Alauddin's army from desecrating them. But Alauddin had these idols hauled out of Betwa. He damaged a number of temples, and plundered a large amount of wealth. According to Badauni's Muntakhab-ut-Tawarikh, Alauddin also brought to Delhi a large Hindu idol, which was placed at the Badaun Gate to be trampled by the people.

Aftermath 

At Bhilsa, Alauddin learned of the immense wealth of the southern Seuna (Yadava) kingdom, and about the routes leading to their capital Devagiri. Therefore, he shrewdly surrendered the loot from Bhilsa to Jalaluddin to gain the Sultan's confidence, while withholding the information on the Yadava kingdom.

A pleased Jalaluddin rewarded Alauddin with the office of Ariz-i Mamalik (Ministry of War), which his father once held. Jalaluddin also made him the governor of Awadh, and granted his request to use the revenue surplus for hiring additional troops. Subsequently, in 1296, Alauddin raided Devagiri, and used that loot to raise an army and usurp the power from Jalaluddin.

References

Bibliography 

 
 
 
 

Bhilsa
Paramara dynasty
Military raids
Battles involving the Rajputs
Battles involving the Delhi Sultanate
History of Madhya Pradesh